Stig Asmussen is an American video game developer, known for his work on the God of War series for Santa Monica Studio. He is currently working for Respawn Entertainment.

Biography 
Asmussen graduated from The Art Institute of Pittsburgh in 1998 with an Associate of Specialized Technology in Computer Animation Media. He is the son of Jes Asmussen, University Distinguished Professor and Executive Director of the Fraunhofer Center for Coatings and Laser Applications at Michigan State University.

Throughout the God of War series, he worked as a lead environment artist, art director, and was game director of God of War III after Cory Barlog's departure.

In an interview in April 2012, according to David Jaffe (creator of God of War), Asmussen was "doing cool stuff" at Santa Monica, and did not work on God of War: Ascension.

In 2014, Asmussen left Santa Monica Studio. He has since joined Respawn Entertainment as a game director. On May 4, 2016 – Star Wars Day – Asmussen announced Respawn Entertainment was making a third-person Star Wars game. This was announced as Star Wars Jedi: Fallen Order.

Games

References

External links 

20th-century births
Year of birth missing (living people)
Place of birth missing (living people)
Living people
Video game designers
Video game directors
Art Institute of Pittsburgh alumni